Yadunath Dattatray Thatte (Devanagari: यदुनाथ दत्तात्रय थत्ते; 5 October 1922 – 10 May 1998) was a Marathi journalist, editor, biographer, social worker  and socialist leader from Maharashtra, India. 

Born at Yeola in the Nashik district, Thatte was one of the prominent leaders of the Indian independence movement in Maharashtra. In 1942, he was sentenced to six months imprisonment for participating in the Quit India Movement.

Thatte was the editor of the Socialist weekly Sadhana from 1956–1982, and a long-time activist in the Rashtra Seva Dal.

Besides biographies of Homi Bhabha, Niels Bohr, C. V. Raman, Earnest R. Ford, Satish Chandra Dasgupta, and Jagdish Chandra Basu, he wrote the following books: 

 Mastakī Himālaya, Antaraṅgī Aṅgāra (1990)
 Cār Pharār (1990)
 Phulatā Nikhārā (1980) 
 Sadānand (1978)
 Sarahadda Gāndhī (1969)
 Āpalā Māna, Āpalā Abhimāna (1966)  
 Akshayapātra (1962) 
 Gahina

References

1922 births
1998 deaths
20th-century Indian journalists
Indian socialists
Marathi-language writers
People from Nashik district
Marathi politicians
Maharashtra politicians
Indian independence activists from Maharashtra
Journalists from Maharashtra